Tredegar Corporation is a publicly traded company that manufactures plastic films and aluminum extrusions. It is headquartered in Richmond, Virginia. This company was formed in 1989 when the aluminium, plastics, and energy units of Ethyl Corporation were spun-off. The energy-related assets were subsequently sold in 1994.

References

Manufacturing companies based in Richmond, Virginia
Companies listed on the New York Stock Exchange